Shakarim Qudaiberdiuly (who was born in Ken-Bulak, Semipalatinsk Oblast and died 2 October 1931 in the Chinghistau tract, Soviet Union, was a Kazakh poet, Hanafi Maturidi theologian philosopher, historian, translator and composer. He is known for being a disciple and nephew of Abai Qunanbaiuly.

Biography 
Comes from the Tobyqty clan of the Arghyn tribe. Worked as a politician and was elected as a volostnoy ruler. Only started to pick up writing in the year 1898, when he was 40. Researched eastern literature and such poets and philosophers like Hafez, Fuzuli, Nava'i, and the works of Alexander Pushkin and Leo Tolstoy. His translation of the Hafiz and Pushkin's «Dubrovsky» remains the best and most well-written. Shakarim was completely fluent in Arabic, Persian, Turkish and Russian. In 1903 he was accepted as a member of the West Siberian branch of the Imperial Russian Geographical Society.

In 1906 he has performed the Hajj in Mecca (with Qanapiya-qazhy, grandfather of Bakhytzhan Kanapyanov). Visited Egypt, Istanbul, worked in libraries and sent all his books to Semipalatinsk (now Semey) by mail. His later years happened to be in the period of 1905-1907 revolution, Stolypin reform, World War I and national-freedom movement of 1916 in Kazakhstan, February and October revolutions, Russian Civil War, soviet takeover of power and collectivization. Was a member of the national movement «Alash».

Was a critic of socialism and when Shakarim found out that the traditional lifestyle of the kazakh nation would change, he asked «For the sake of what, in the name of what and for what purpose to destroy, and what in return?». His views completely opposed the idea of a forcefully created country, hence why he decides to live in a secluded fashion.

Starting from the year 1922, resided in the mountains Chinghistau.

On October 2 of 1931 was shot without trial or investigation. Despite the commands of the Prosecutor General's Office stating his innocence, the works have remained banned until the 1980s.

The works published by Shakarim himself include the book «Mirror of the Kazakhs» (kaz. "Қазақ айнасы"), the poem «Qalqaman-mamyr» and «Enlik-Kebek», individual poems, articles and essays were published in 1913-1924 in the magazines "Abay", "Aykap", "Sholpan", the newspapers "Kazakh", "Abay" and "Sholpan" published his translations from Hafiz and Fizuli's poem "Leyli and Majnun". A poetic translation of "Dubrovsky" and "Snowstorm" by Alexander Pushkin was published in 1936 in Alma-Ata (now Almaty) in the journal "Adebiet Maidana". Bakhytzhan Kanapyanov translated his works into Russian in 1989..

Remembrance 

 Semey State University is named after him
 In commemoration of the 150th anniversary of the poet, 2008 was declared the "Year of Shakarim". Semipalatinsk hosted an international scientific-practical conference "Creativity of Shakarim in the context of Kazakh and world culture". Several presentations took place at the scientific forum - the encyclopedia "Shakarim", the multi-volume scientific series "Issues of Shakarim Studies" and the documentary film "Shakarim's Land".
 In the central park of the city Semey there is a statue of Shakarim Qudaiberdiuly done by sculptor Shot-Aman Walikhanov.
 Several scientists, followers of Shakarim's work, devoted their works to the anniversary of the great Kazakh thinker. In Russian translation, the book "Danyshpan Shakarim" (from kaz. "The Wisdom of Shakarim") by academician Garifolla Yesim, dedicated to his work, the documentary book "Shakarim" was made  about the life and work of the poet by a journalist Daulet Seisenuly, an album of paintings was made about Shakarim by academician Makash Aliyakparov, and family member Keldenbay Olmesekov released an album with songs of Shakarim. The CD includes previously unknown works of the outstanding poet.
 In 2008 a postcard was made in memory of Shakarim.

References 

Kazakhstani poets
Ethnic Kazakh people
Kazakh-language writers
1858 births
1931 deaths
Kazakhstani people executed by the Soviet Union
Soviet poets
Hanafis
Maturidis